Markku Lauri Johannes Wettenranta, better known by his stage name Tasis, is a Finnish rapper. Besides being one of the founders of the record company Rähinä Records, Tasis was also part of the group Kapasiteettiyksikkö together with Uniikki and Andu.

Selected discography

As a featured artist

References

Living people
Finnish rappers
Year of birth missing (living people)